Wagg is a surname. Notable people with the surname include:

Elsie Wagg (1876–1949), English philanthropist
Graham Wagg (born 1983), English cricketer
Lynette Wagg (born 1939), Australian sprint canoeist

Fictional characters
Jolyon Wagg, character in the comics series The Adventures of Tintin

See also
WAGG